Mohawk College of Applied Arts and Technology is a public college of applied arts and technology located in Hamilton, Ontario. Established in 1966, the college currently has five main campuses: the Fennell Campus on the Hamilton Mountain, the Marshall School of Skilled Trades and Apprenticeship Campus in Stoney Creek, the Mohawk-McMaster Institute for Applied Health Sciences at McMaster University., the Centre for Aviation Technology Campus and a Mississauga campus at Square One in partnership with triOS a private career college.

, more than 1,000 faculty instructors, 12,500 full-time students, 4,000 apprentices, 46,000 continuing education registrants, and 1,800 international students have studied in more than 130 post-secondary and apprenticeship programs. Since its founding, over 115,000 students have graduated from Mohawk College.

History 
Mohawk College was established during the formation of Ontario's college system in 1966. The school was founded in 1967 as part of a provincial initiative to create many such institutions to provide career-oriented advanced diploma, diploma, and certificate courses, as well as continuing education programs to Ontario communities.

Awards and recognition 
Mohawk has received three national Yves Landry Foundation awards. The Mohawk and McMaster University Bachelor of Technology Partnership was recognized with the Yves Landry 2006 Innovative Manufacturing Technology Program Award: University Level. Yves Landry Awards were also presented to Mohawk's Modern Foundry Technologies Institute in 2001 and its Integrated Technician Apprenticeship Program in 2004.

Mohawk Advertising students have won more than 30 national Canadian Marketing Association awards and have won gold in the student creative category for seven consecutive years.

Every year, Mohawk celebrates the career achievements and community contributions of outstanding alumni. Mohawk Alumni of Distinction recipients are nominated by the college for Premier's Awards.

In 2007, Mohawk Vice President Academic (retired) Rosemary Knechtel received the Association of Colleges of Applied Arts and Technology of Ontario (now Colleges Ontario) Distinguished Service Award.

In 2008, Mohawk early childhood education graduate Debbie Crickmore and ECE professor Karyn Callaghan received YWCA Hamilton Women of Distinction Awards.

The award was accepted by Owen Thomas, representing the journalism program, and Thomas Raike representing the television program.

Programs 
Mohawk offers two-year Ontario college diplomas, three-year Ontario college advanced diplomas, one-year Ontario college graduate certificates and four-year collaborative degree programs, the latter in association with McMaster University.

Mohawk offers more than 130 full-time programs, apprenticeship programs and more than 1,000 continuing education courses.

Mohawk specialise in health science and engineering technology education and is the largest trainer of apprentices in Ontario.

To serve Hamilton's growing immigrant population, Mohawk offers English language training and innovative bridging programs for foreign-trained professionals in health sciences and engineering technology.

In 2021, Mohawk opened a centre for aviation technology, consisting of a 75,000 square foot classroom and laboratory space located at the Hamilton International Airport. That same year, Mohawk introduced an accelerated training program for Personal Support Workers, which allows students to become fully credentialed graduates within a six month time period.

Scholarships 
In November 2009, the College joined Project Hero, a scholarship program cofounded by General (Ret'd) Rick Hillier for the families of fallen Canadian Forces members.

Media 
The college operates a campus radio station, 101.5 The Hawk, and an online student newspaper Ignite News.

Library 
Mohawk College has five library locations, one of which is an e-Library. The Fennell Campus library is named the Harold Cummings Library after a $4 million donation by the late Harold Cummings and father of a Mohawk library employee. At the time of the donation in 2009, it was the largest private donation in Mohawk's history.

Faculties 
The faculties include the McKeil School of Business, Faculty of Media and Entertainment, Faculty of Engineering Technology, Faculty of Health Sciences, and the Faculty of Community and Urban Studies.

Campuses

Fennell Campus 

The Fennell Campus in Hamilton is Mohawk's main campus and is home to programs from Mohawk's McKeil School of Business, Communication Arts, Technology and Community Services programs.

Opened in 2018, the Joyce Centre for Partnership & Innovation (Fennel Campus EA Wing) is the cornerstone of a renewal of technology labs and classrooms. Once construction and renovations are complete, enrolment in technology programs will grow from 3,500 to 4,500 students and applied research activity will increase by 50 per cent.

The Fennell Campus is home to the College's McKeil School of Business (i Wing), which is named in honour of Blair and Kathy McKeil. The McKeil family and their company, Mckeil Marine, are proud supporters of Mohawk. The McKeil School of Business is home to students in advertising, business, marketing, public relations and office administration programs.

Mohawk is a member of the Ontario Colleges Athletic Association. In September 2013, Mohawk officially opened the 64,000 square foot David Braley Athletic and Recreation Centre. The $35 million centre is open to all students for varsity and intramural sports and personal fitness.

The McIntyre Performing Arts Centre accommodates up to 1039 people and is only second to Hamilton Place in size in the area.

Stoney Creek Campus 
Mohawk claims to be the largest trainer of apprentices in Ontario, with more than 4,000 apprentices at the Stoney Creek Campus.
The newest addition to the campus is a 12,000 square foot building now under construction across from the Gerald Marshall Centre for Transportation. Half of the $3 million building is dedicated to a shop where apprentices from across the campus will work together on large scale community projects. The centre will also include classrooms and programmable control labs.

IAHS at McMaster University in Hamilton 
More than 1,700 full-time students attend Mohawk-McMaster Institute for Applied Health Sciences (IAHS), the first facility in Canada to combine college and university health sciences education and research under one roof. The IAHS is home to collaborative nursing and medical radiation sciences programs that have achieved the highest level of accreditation possible. The IAHS includes a clinical simulation lab modelled after a hospital ward and a fully operational medical radiation lab where students gain hands-on experience prior to clinical placements. Starting in 2016, more than $3 million in renovations will transform the campus into a one-of-akind simulated hospital and long-term care centre. Students from Mohawk's Nursing, Practical Nursing, Medical Radiation Sciences, Personal Support Worker and Pharmacy Technician programs will learn together in cross disciplinary teams, mirroring how they'll work during their clinical placements and throughout their careers.

City School by Mohawk 
City School by Mohawk was launched in the fall of 2015 with the opening of the City School location at the Eva Rothwell Centre in North Hamilton.

Notable alumni 
 Dominic Agostino, politician
 Jillian Barberie, television personality
 Brad Clark, politician, former PC MPP and Hamilton City Councillor
 Fred Eisenberger, Mayor of Hamilton
 Annette Hamm, journalist, CHCH Morning Live host
Gary Jones, actor of Stargate SG1 and Stargate Atlantis fame
 Master T (Tony Young), former VJ for MuchMusic in Toronto
 Alex Pierson, formerly SUN News Network morning host
 Joey Muha, drummer and YouTube content creator.

See also 
 Canadian government scientific research organizations
 Canadian industrial research and development organizations
 Canadian university scientific research organizations
 Higher education in Ontario
 List of colleges in Ontario
 List of universities in Ontario

References

External links 

 

Colleges in Ontario
Education in Hamilton, Ontario
Educational institutions established in 1966
Education in Brantford
1966 establishments in Ontario